The 2016–17 NIFL Premiership (known as the Danske Bank Premiership for sponsorship reasons) was the ninth season of Northern Ireland's highest national football league in this format since its inception in 2008, the 116th season of Irish league football overall, and the fourth season of the league operating as part of the Northern Ireland Football League. The fixtures were announced on 7 July 2016. The season began on 6 August 2016 and ended on 29 April 2017, with the play-offs taking place in May 2017.

Crusaders were the two-time defending champions after winning the title for the previous two seasons. On 29 April 2017, Linfield beat Cliftonville 3–1 to win their 52nd league title on the final day of the season.

It was an unlikely title win for Linfield, as after a 1–0 home defeat to Coleraine in January 2017, they sat seven points behind defending champions, Crusaders. A 1–1 draw at home against Portadown on 17 February 2017 meant the gap had grown to nine points with nine games left to play. However, Linfield won all nine of their remaining games, going unbeaten in their last 14 games of the season since the Coleraine defeat, winning 13 of them and drawing the other (the 1–1 draw against Portadown). They picked up 40 out of a possible 42 points to capitalise on Crusaders dropping points, and pipped them to the title on the final day of the season by two points.

Linfield qualified for the 2017–18 UEFA Champions League. The runners-up, Crusaders, along with third-placed Coleraine and the play-off winners, Ballymena United, qualified for the 2017–18 UEFA Europa League.

Teams
Twelve teams competed in the 2016–17 NIFL Premiership. Warrenpoint Town were relegated after finishing bottom of the 2015–16 NIFL Premiership and after a failed appeal against an IFA ruling not to deduct points from Carrick Rangers after their manager incorrectly served a touchline ban. Warrenpoint Town were replaced by Ards as the winners of the 2015–16 NIFL Championship.

Ballinamallard United finished second from bottom but retained their Premiership place after winning the promotion-relegation play-off against NIFL Championship runners-up Institute 5–4 on aggregate. Portadown started this season with a 12-point deduction, after the IFA found the club guilty of breaching the rules by paying Peter McMahon, despite the player being contracted to the club as an amateur. The club appealed against the decision, but this was rejected in October 2016.

Stadia and locations

League table

Results

Matches 1–22
During matches 1–22 each team played every other team twice (home and away).

Matches 23–33
During matches 23–33 each team played every other team for the third time (either at home, or away).

Matches 34–38
During matches 34–38 each team played every other team in their half of the table once. As this was the fourth time that teams played each other this season, home sides were chosen so that they will have played each other twice at home and twice away.

Section A

Section B

Play-offs

UEFA Europa League play-offs
Teams finishing fourth to seventh took part in Europa League play-offs to decide which team would qualify for next season's Europa League first qualifying round.

Semi-finals

Final

NIFL Premiership play-offs

Pre-play-off
The runners-up and third-placed teams from the Championship, Institute and Ballyclare Comrades respectively, took part (over two legs) in a pre-play-off.

Institute won 3–2 on aggregate.

Play-off
The eleventh-placed team from the Premiership, Carrick Rangers, played the winners of the pre-play-off, Institute, over two legs for one spot in the 2017–18 NIFL Premiership.

Carrick Rangers won 5–2 on aggregate and retained their spot in the NIFL Premiership for the 2017–18 season; Institute remained in the NIFL Championship.

Top goalscorers

References

External links

NIFL Premiership seasons
Northern Ireland
2016–17 in Northern Ireland association football